Abeille Gélinas, also known as DJ Abeille, (born July 12, 1979) is a Canadian DJ, entertainer and actress.

Biography
Born in the province of Quebec, she is the sister of actress and singer Mitsou and the granddaughter of actor Gratien Gélinas.

She studied at the Stella Adler Academy of Acting in Los Angeles. In addition to acting, she has been VJ for the MusiquePlus channel (1996–98) and columnist for the Journal de Montréal, the 24 Hours newspaper and Loulou magazine.

Gélinas married Na'eem Adam on 31 August 2013. She gave birth to their son, Zayne, on 8 June 2015.

Filmography

References

External links
 
 

1979 births
Living people
Actresses from Quebec
Canadian columnists
Stella Adler Studio of Acting alumni
Canadian DJs
Canadian women columnists